Rosengård (literally "Rose Manor") was a city district in the center of Malmö Municipality, Sweden. On 1 July 2013, it was merged with Husie, forming Öster. In 2012, Rosengård had a population of 23,563 of the municipality's 307,758. Its area was 332 hectares.

Rosengård is often incorrectly referred to as a suburb, although the area is located centrally in Malmö, neighbouring the former city district Centrum. Long a destination for immigrants, 86% of the population had some foreign ancestry in 2008.

History
Most of Rosengård was built between 1967 and 1972 as a part of the Million Programme although some parts, such as the mansion in Herrgården, and Östra kyrkogården, are older. Rosengård is to a high degree populated by minorities. In 1972, the percentage of immigrants was around 18%, with the majority of inhabitants being working-class people from rural Sweden. Since 1974, there has been a white flight out of the area as more immigrants were assigned there. By 2012, the figure for those of immigrant background was given as 86%.

Violence

Rosengård has also been the place for several violent clashes between gangs and between the resident youths and authorities. Fire crews and ambulance personnel have also been threatened and attacked, as well as the police. 

In December 2008, riots occurred as youngsters confronted the police in which cars, wagons, kiosks, building sheds, recycling stations, and bicycle sheds were set ablaze. The background to the riots was the eviction of a local mosque. The riot was the most violent yet seen in an urban area in Sweden. The riot finally ended when police forces from Gothenburg and Stockholm were sent in.

In June 2011, shots were fired at the lower floor of the police station in Rosengård. Nobody was arrested.

In its December 2015 report, the Swedish Police Authority placed the southern half of the district in the most severe category of urban areas with high crime rates.

In the summer of 2016, Malmö in Sweden suffered a wave of vehicle fires where 70 vehicles were destroyed in a series of attacks. Around half the fires took place in Rosengård. In the same year, after a criminal family had been evicted in an effort by the housing company to reduce crime, the office of the housing company was subjected to three bomb attacks.

2020 and 2022 riots
In August 2020, the riots in Malmö started in Rosengård with about 300 people rioting. The unrest broke out at 19.00 in the evening after activists from the Danish Hard Line party had burned a Quran during the afternoon and posted a film of their action on social media. Swedish authorities had earlier denied Hard Line party leader Rasmus Paludan a permit to hold a demonstration featuring the burning of the Quran and he was stopped at the border. The rioters set fire to property and attacked police officers and police vehicle with rocks while chanting antisemitic slogans.

In April 2022, the riots in Malmö started in Rosengård.

Film
The Netflix drama web television series based on the writings of Henning Mankell about fictional Inspector Kurt Wallander, Young Wallander, features Rosengård heavily in the series as the main focus of the story line. Sara Ringman criticizes the series as biased, repeating myths, most of the scenes were filmed in Lithuania.

Neighbourhoods

The neighbourhoods of Rosengård were:

Rosengård Centrum is a shopping mall with several stores. Zlatan Court, a football field sponsored by the football player Zlatan Ibrahimović, is situated in the area too.

Places of worship
Malmö Mosque is located nearby. It is situated a few hundred metres from the church in Västra Skrävlinge.

According to Swedish Defence University reports in 2009 and 2018, there are a number of Islamic prayer rooms (Swedish: källarmoskéer) in Rosengård spreading a radical salafist ideology.

Demographics

In 2007, 60% were born outside of Sweden. In 2008, 86% of the population was of foreign background.

The ten largest groups of foreign-born persons in 2010 were:
  Iraq (2,957)
  Former Yugoslavia (2,172)
  Lebanon (1,370)
  Bosnia and Herzegovina (1,211)
  Somalia (550)
  Denmark (541)
  Poland (475)
  Afghanistan (406)
  Turkey (357)
  Pakistan (230)

Social issues
Unemployment and education are two major issues in the area. Only 38% of the population in Rosengård are employed and 60% complete elementary school, compared to a citywide average (inclusive Rosengård) of 80%.

Sports

Notable people
 Zlatan Ibrahimović
 Osama Krayem
 Yksel Osmanovski
 Labinot Harbuzi
 Goran Slavkovski
 Ilir Latifi
 Rebstar
 Saint
 Dollar Bill, hip hop group
 Pinar Yalcin
 Anel Ahmedhodžić

References

External links

 Rosengård: hardship and hope, The Local
 Sweden sticks to multiculturalism, BBC
 Fighting for Sweden's migrants, BBC

Former city districts of Malmö
1967 establishments in Sweden
1972 establishments in Sweden